In Greek mythology, Philonome or Phylonome (Ancient Greek: Φιλονόμη) was a name shared by two individuals:

 Phylonome, daughter of Nyctimus (son of Lycaon) and Arcadia. She was a maiden who used to hunt with Artemis until Ares seduced her in the guise of a shepherd. Being pregnant and fearing her father, she cast her twin children, Lycastus and Parrhasius, into the river Erymanthus, but they found haven in the trunk of a tree. Later a wolf suckled the children and a shepherd, Gyliphus, reared them as if they were his own sons.
 Philonome, also called Polyboea or Scamandria, daughter of Tragasus and second wife of King Cycnus of Colonae. She fell in love with her stepson Tenes and, being rejected, falsely accused him before Cycnus of having made love to her. But when her husband discovered the truth, he buried her alive in the earth.

Notes

References 

Apollodorus, The Library with an English Translation by Sir James George Frazer, F.B.A., F.R.S. in 2 Volumes, Cambridge, MA, Harvard University Press; London, William Heinemann Ltd. 1921. . Online version at the Perseus Digital Library. Greek text available from the same website.

Lucius Mestrius Plutarchus, Moralia with an English Translation by Frank Cole Babbitt. Cambridge, MA. Harvard University Press. London. William Heinemann Ltd. 1936. Online version at the Perseus Digital Library. Greek text available from the same website.
 Pausanias, Description of Greece with an English Translation by W.H.S. Jones, Litt.D., and H.A. Ormerod, M.A., in 4 Volumes. Cambridge, MA, Harvard University Press; London, William Heinemann Ltd. 1918. . Online version at the Perseus Digital Library
 Pausanias, Graeciae Descriptio. 3 vols. Leipzig, Teubner. 1903.  Greek text available at the Perseus Digital Library.

Women in Greek mythology
Characters in Greek mythology